Ramakrishanapur is a census town and a municipality in Mancherial district of the Indian state of Telangana.

Demographics 
 India census, Ramakrishanapur had a population of 42,275. Males constitute 51% of population and females 49%. Ramakrishnapur has an average literacy rate of 59%, lower than the national average of 59.5%.Male literacy is 67% and female literacy is 51%. In Ramakrishnapur 11% of the population is under 6 years of age.

References 

Cities and towns in Adilabad district
Census towns in Adilabad district